Où veux-tu qu'je r'garde is the first album from French alternative rock group Noir Désir. Released in 1987, it was produced by Theo Hakola, at the time the singer for the group Passion Fodder.

Track listing
All music composed by Noir Désir; all lyrics composed by Bertrand Cantat
 "Où veux-tu qu'je r'garde" - 4:43
 "Toujours être ailleurs" - 4:32
 "La Rage" - 3:13
 "Pyromane" - 4:22
 "Danse sur le feu Maria" - 3:56
 "Lola" - 5:10

Noir Désir albums
1987 debut albums
Barclay (record label) albums